The first season of the crime drama television series Wentworth originally aired on SoHo in Australia. The season consisted of 10 episodes and aired between 1 May and 3 July 2013. It was executively produced by FremantleMedia's director of drama Jo Porter. The series is a remake of Prisoner, which aired on Network Ten from 1979 to 1986. Lara Radulovich and David Hannam developed Wentworth from Reg Watson's original concept. The season was shot over four months from 10 October 2012. 

The show is set in modern-day Victoria, Australia and focuses on the fictional women's prison Wentworth. The central characters in the prison are inmates Bea Smith (Danielle Cormack), Franky Doyle (Nicole da Silva), Doreen Anderson (Shareena Clanton), Liz Birdsworth  (Celia Ireland), Jacs Holt (Kris McQuade) and prison officers Vera Bennett (Kate Atkinson), Matthew Fletcher (Aaron Jeffery), Will Jackson (Robbie Magasiva), Erica Davidson (Leeanna Walsman) and Meg Jackson (Catherine McClements).

The season received generally favourable reviews from critics. The first episode of Wentworth attracted 244,000 viewers, making it the most watched Australian drama series premiere in Foxtel history. The complete first season was released on DVD and Blu-ray in Australia on 18 November 2013.

Cast

Regular 
 Danielle Cormack as Bea Smith 	 
 Nicole da Silva as Franky Doyle
 Kris McQuade as Jacs Holt	
 Leeanna Walsman as Governor Erica Davidson	 
 Kate Atkinson as Deputy Governor Vera Bennett	 
 Celia Ireland as Liz Birdsworth	 
 Shareena Clanton as Doreen Anderson	 
 Aaron Jeffery as Matthew "Fletch" Fletcher senior officer 	 
 Robbie Magasiva as Will Jackson senior officer	 
 Catherine McClements as Meg Jackson

Recurring  
 Katrina Milosevic as Sue "Boomer" Jenkins 
 Ra Chapman as Kim Chang
 Georgia Flood as Debbie Smith
 Jacqueline Brennan as Linda Miles
 Martin Sacks as Derek Channing
 Ally Fowler as Simone "Simmo" Slater
 Jada Alberts as Toni Goodes
 Jake Ryan as Harry Smith
 Reef Ireland as Brayden Holt
 Melitta St Just as Megan Summers
 Benne Harrison as Roz Jago
 Rondah Dam as Pip Turner

Episodes

Production
Wentworth was announced by Foxtel on 4 March 2012. Developed by Lara Radulovich and David Hannam from the original concept by Reg Watson, it is produced by Fremantle's new head of drama, Jo Porter, and is filmed in Melbourne. FremantleMedia Chief Executive Asia Pacific, Ian Hogg, said: "An entire generation of Australians grew up watching Prisoner and another is about to do the same with Wentworth."

Filming
The ten-part season began filming in Melbourne for five months from 10 October 2012 and the shoot employed 300 cast and crew. Wentworth is filmed on a purpose built set in the suburb of Clayton.

Reception

Ratings

Accolades

 Australian Screen Editors (2013)
 Nominated: Best Editing in a Television Drama — Philip Watts
 AACTA Awards (2014)
 Nominated: Best Guest or Supporting Actress in a Television Drama — Kris McQuade
 Nominated: Best Television Drama Series — Wentworth - Jo Porter & Amanda Crittenden
 ASTRA Awards (2014)
 Won: Most Outstanding Drama — Wentworth 
 Nominated: Most Outstanding New Talent — Shareena Clanton 
 Nominated: Most Outstanding Performance by a Female Actor — Danielle Cormack 
 Won: Most Outstanding Performance by a Female Actor — Nicole da Silva
 Nominated: Most Outstanding Performance by a Female Actor — Kris McQuade
 Nominated: Most Outstanding Performance by a Male Actor — Aaron Jeffery
 Nominated: Most Outstanding Performance by a Male Actor — Robbie Magasiva 
 Equity Ensemble Awards (2014)
 Nominated: Equity Award for Most Outstanding Performance by an Ensemble in a Drama Series — Cast of Wentworth
 Logie Awards (2014)
 Nominated: Logie Award for Most Outstanding Drama Series — Wentworth 
 Nominated: Logie Award for Most Outstanding Actress — Danielle Cormack
 Nominated: Logie Award for Most Outstanding Newcomer — Shareena Clanton

Home media

Notes

References

2013 American television seasons
2013 Australian television series debuts
Wentworth (TV series)